Peter Waterhouse (March 24, 1956) is an Austrian writer and translator.

Born to of a British father and an Austrian mother, he studied German and English literature at the University of Vienna, and later in Los Angeles, where he completed a PhD on Paul Celan. He has won a number of important literary prizes, including the manuskripte prize (1990), the Heimito von Doderer Prize (1997), the Austrian State Prize for Translation (2002), the H.C. Artmann Prize (2004), and the Erich Fried Prize (2007).

He translates poetry into German from both English and Italian.

External links 
 Author Page
 Waterhouse reading a poem

Austrian male poets
Austrian translators
1956 births
Living people
English–German translators
Italian–German translators